Viktor Teplý (born 19 October 1990 in Brno) is a Czech sailor. He competed at the 2012 and 2016 Summer Olympics in the Men's Laser class.

References

External links
 
 
 

1990 births
Living people
Czech male sailors (sport)
Olympic sailors of the Czech Republic
Sailors at the 2012 Summer Olympics – Laser
Sailors at the 2016 Summer Olympics – Laser
Sportspeople from Brno